is a town located in Mie Prefecture, Japan. , the town had an estimated population of 6,134 in 2518 households and a population density of 390 persons per km².

Geography
Kisosaki is located in far northeastern Mie Prefecture on the border with Aichi Prefecture. The town is located on islands formed by the delta of the Kiso Three Rivers as they exit to Ise Bay.

Neighboring municipalities
Mie Prefecture
Kuwana
Aichi Prefecture
Yatomi

Climate
Kisosaki has a Humid subtropical climate (Köppen Cfa) characterized by warm summers and cool winters with light to no snowfall.  The average annual temperature in Kisosaki is 14.9 °C. The average annual rainfall is 1656 mm with September as the wettest month. The temperatures are highest on average in August, at around 26.6 °C, and lowest in January, at around 3.5 °C.

Demographics
Per Japanese census data, the population of Kisosaki increased rapidly in the 1980s.

History
The village of Kisosaki was established on April 1, 1889 with the establishment of the modern municipalities system. It was raised to town status in 1989.

Government
Kisosaki has a mayor-council form of government with a directly elected mayor and a unicameral city council of eight members. Kisosaki, collectively with the city of Kuwana, contributes four members to the Mie Prefectural Assembly. In terms of national politics, the town is part of Mie 3rd district of the lower house of the Diet of Japan.

Economy
The local economy is dominated by the growing of tomatoes and by food processing industries.

Education
Kisosaki has one public elementary school and one public middle school operated by the town government. The town does not have a high school.

Transportation

Railway
Kisosaki is not served by any railways.

Highway
 Isewangan Expressway

Local attractions 
Suigō Prefectural Natural Park
Kiso Three Rivers

References

External links

Kisosaki official website 

Towns in Mie Prefecture
Populated coastal places in Japan
Kisosaki, Mie